Radwa  is a Syrian village located in Qurqania Nahiyah in Harem District, Idlib.  According to the Syria Central Bureau of Statistics (CBS), Radwa had a population of 567 in the 2004 census.

References 

Populated places in Harem District